The Cyprus national under-18 football team are a feeder team for the main Cyprus national football team.

Cyprus national football team
European national under-18 association football teams